Argyrostrotis erasa, the erasa chocolate moth, is a moth of the family Noctuidae. The species was first described by Achille Guenée in 1852.) It is found in the US from North Carolina south to Florida and Texas.

The wingspan is about 30 mm.

References

Moths described in 1852
Catocalinae
Moths of North America